Subramaniam Badrinath (born 30 August 1980) is a former Indian cricketer. He is a right-handed middle order batsman.  Badrinath has represented India in One Day International and test matches.  In first class cricket, he captains Vidarbha and was captain of Tamil Nadu earlier. In the Indian Premier League, he represented Chennai Super Kings till 2013 and Royal Challengers Bangalore in 2015. He has also represented the Indian Board President's XI on several occasions. He was named in the 30 man provisional squad for the 2007 Cricket World Cup but did not make it to the final squad.
Badrinath was a prolific scorer for Tamil Nadu in first class cricket. In 2008, Badrinath has signed for the Indian Premier League side Chennai Super Kings. He was considered as one of the candidates in line for a spot in the middle order of the Indian test team and made his Test debut on 6 February 2010, scoring 56 in the first innings at the VCA Stadium in Nagpur. He was born in a Tamil brahmin family

He gained the selectors attention during the 2011 IPL season, playing an important role in the team's success and becoming known as "Mr Dependable" and reliable for Chennai Super Kings. Due to that, and his performance in the domestic season, he received a spot in the Indian squad for their tour of the West Indies. Following the retirement of V. V. S. Laxman, Badrinath was called back to the Indian Test cricket team to play New Zealand at home. He was unsold in IPL 2014 players auction and was picked up by the Bangalore franchise as a backup in 2015. In 2015, he moved to represent Vidarbha in first class due to limited opportunities with Tamil Nadu.

In August 2018, he retired from all forms of cricket.

Notes

External links
 

1980 births
Living people
Indian cricketers
India Twenty20 International cricketers
India Test cricketers
India One Day International cricketers
Tamil Nadu cricketers
Chennai Super Kings cricketers
South Zone cricketers
India Red cricketers
India Blue cricketers
India Green cricketers
Cricketers from Chennai
Tamil sportspeople
Padma Seshadri Bala Bhavan schools alumni
Royal Challengers Bangalore cricketers